Elementfour (variants Element Four and Element 4) was a music producing duo made up of DJ Paul Oakenfold and  musician/composer Andy Gray. Sometime before July 2000, they collaborated in writing and producing the opening theme for the Channel 4 reality series Big Brother. The theme, which was later released as a single, continued to be used when Big Brother and Celebrity Big Brother moved to Channel 5 from 18 August 2011 until the show was axed and ended on 5 November 2018. A sample from the track was used again in 2022 to promote the upcoming 2023 series on ITV2.

Discography

Singles
As Elementfour
2000: "Big Brother UK TV Theme"
2000: "Element Four" (Belgium) (reached No.13 in the Ultratop Dance charts)
As Paul Oakenfold and Andy Gray
2000: "Tast-E" (Australia, Greece) (did not chart)

References

External links

English electronic music duos
Musical groups established in 2000
Musical groups disestablished in 2000
Big Brother (British TV series)
Celebrity Big Brother